Jeep Beat Collective is the best known recording name of British hip hop DJ Dave Davies. He has also recorded under the names Mindbomb, Godfather of Weird and Dave the Ruf. His music carries a heavy emphasis on scratching, but he also raps. In 1999, Spin magazine included Jeep Beat Collective in their list of the "Top 13 turntablists" in the world. He also runs the Ruf Beats record label.

Albums
As Jeep Beat Collective:
Attack of the Wildstyle Beatfreaks (1995)
For.... Jimi-Hendrix (1998)
Technics Chainsaw Massacre (1998)
Death Race 2001 (2001)

As Mindbomb:
Trippin´ Thru the Minefield: Volume One
Trippin´ Thru the Minefield: Volume Two
Great British Beef

Compilation appearances
The Document - DJ Andy Smith
Refried Food Parts 5 & 6 - DJ Food
Operation Overlord - La Crème de la Crème of Underground British Hip-Hop (Coke Star Produktions/Night & Day, 1997) (French release)
Operation Overlord - La Crème de la Crème of Underground British Hip-Hop (Coke Star Produktions/Virgin/EMI, 1998) (worldwide reissue)

References

External links
Myspace page
Official website
2000 interview
2002 interview
List of Ruf Beats releases

English male rappers
English DJs
Living people
Year of birth missing (living people)